Rillieux-la-Pape is a commune in the Metropolis of Lyon in the Auvergne-Rhône-Alpes region of central-eastern France. In 2017, it had a population of 30,012.

Population

Climate

Twin cities
Rillieux-la-Pape is twinned with three cities:
 Łęczyca, Poland
 Natitingou, Benin
 Ditzingen, Germany

See also
Communes of the Metropolis of Lyon

References

External links

 Official website (in French)

Communes of Lyon Metropolis